The headquarters of Northeast Frontier Railway and Northeast Frontier Railway Stadium is situated here.

The place is also known for goddess Durga pandals. There are several temples and places of worship in and around Maligaon. Hanuman Mandir, Kali Mandir are of special interest.

Town square
The focal point of Maligaon is its town square. It is located between Jalukbari Point and the Kamakhya foothills of  Kamakhya Temple.

Maligaon was previously a part of Pandu but from 1975 became part of Guwahati (Municipality Corporation). The Padmanath Gohain Baruah Road (P.N.G.B. Road) runs from Maligaon Chariali to NH-37 at Tetelia via Maligaon Goshala. The fourth road is the one that originates at Maligaon Chariali and runs northwest towards Pandu Cabin, touching Aruna Cinema Hall and Pandu College on the way. The Jalukbari Police Station lies at this corner of the Chariali.

A foot overbridge for pedestrians was inaugurated in early 2013, and later demolished in January 2023 to allow for the construction of the Maligaon overpass.

Transportation

Air
It is connected by air through Lokpriya Gopinath Bordoloi International Airport.

Railways 

The "Northeast Frontier Railway" abbreviated as N.F. Railway is one of the 18 railway zones in Indian Railways, headquartered at  Maligaon, it is responsible for rail operations in the entire Northeast and parts of West Bengal and Bihar. Kamakhya Junction, earlier named as Jalukbari, directly connects Maligaon with many major cities of the country. However, Guwahati Railway Station is a major railway station which is 4 miles (approx 7 km) from Central Maligaon.

Education
 St. Vivekananda English Academy
Kendriya Vidyalaya Maligaon
St. Mary's Senior Secondary school
 NF Railway Netaji Vidyapeeth Higher Secondary School
 Capital Public School
 Railway Boys Assamese High School
 Kamakhya Vidyalaya High School
 Swarna English Academy
 Lalit Chandra Bharali College
 West Guwahati Commerce College

Hospitals
The area has a number of hospitals like the NF Railway Central Hospital, Swagat Hospital and Sanjevani Hospital. Also there is a Health Unit at Boripara run by the State Government.

Festivals and people

Maligaon locality of Guwahati have a population of 50,065 people as per as 2011 census.
There are diversified important traditional festivals in Maligaon. Durga Puja is the most important and common as the locality is dominated by Bengali Hindus who are predominant majority in this locality. Bengali new year is also celebrated with great enthusiasm.

Places of interest
 Kamakhya Temple, atop the Neelachal hill, the highest spot in the city, draws pilgrims from all over India especially during the Ambubachi festival. A high seat of the shakti sect, it is associated with the legend of the mother goddess who slayed the legendary demon king Narakasur who ruled ancient Assam.
 Maligaon Chariali

Sports
Northeast Frontier Railway Stadium is a multi-purpose stadium. The ground is mainly used for organizing matches of football, cricket and other sports.  The stadium has hosted 33 rd first-class matches  in 1976 when Assam cricket team played against Orissa cricket team. The ground hosted 32more first-class matches from 1978 to 2009. The stadium also hosted 18 List A matches when Central Zone cricket team played against North Zone cricket team but since then the stadium has hosted non-first-class matches.

See also
 Bhetapara
 Beltola
 Chandmari
 Paltan Bazaar
 Ganeshguri

References

External links
 cricinfo
 North-East Frontier Railway

Neighbourhoods in Guwahati